Acts of God is the concluding novel of the Christ Clone Trilogy, written by James BeauSeigneur. This book primarily chronicles the Bowl Judgements as foretold in the Book of Revelation, as well as the institution of Mark of the beast, and the growing persecution of the followers of God. Other biblical prophecies from the Book of Revelation and the Book of Daniel are depicted as well.

As with the first and second book in this trilogy, many footnotes are used from various sources. These sources include not only the Bible, but also sources that were used as the author performed research and analysis to ensure scientific accuracy in the depiction of fictional events.

Plot
The book starts before the conclusion of Birth of an Age. Christopher Goodman's address from the top of the Third Temple in Jerusalem is revisited, concluding with Christopher leaping from the top of the temple, and caught by the visible Spirit beings, whom Christopher identified as Theatans on the flight to Jerusalem with Decker Hawthorne and Robert Milner. Christopher is an extremely popular Secretary General of the United Nations, who was nominated following his supernatural healing of various members of the Security Council, and elected unanimously prior to his assassination, and subsequent resurrection.

Christopher reveals to the world that humanity is on the brink of its greatest evolutionary step, which people are now heralding as the New Age. However, given the nature of this evolutionary step - that of evolving into nearly omnipotent Spirit Beings - this step must be taken collectively by the entire species, rather than through natural selection of individual members of the human race. If any significant portion of the human population balks at taking this evolutionary step, the evolutionary process will be a failure, and humankind will lose the opportunity to evolve, and remain a stagnant species doomed for extinction. The greatest threat to humankind in taking this evolutionary step is represented by Fundamentalist Christians and various Jewish sects, including a group of 144,000 Jews which call themselves the Koum Damar Patar or KDP for short. These groups remained loyal to Yahweh, whom Christopher has identified as a power-hungry Theatan, intent on keeping humankind as they are, in order to prevent them from becoming his equal.

Christopher vows not to let this happen, and declares the New Age, starting with year 1. March 11, the day of Christopher's resurrection, is declared New Year's Day. Three days after Christopher's address at the Temple, the bodies of John and Saul Cohen are called into Heaven. This is captured on tape by the media, but is dismissed by Christopher as dramatics by Yahweh to frighten people away from their destinies. A life-size statue of Christopher is erected at the top of the Temple, and speakers are set to broadcast Christopher's Address to Humankind in a repeating loop.

Here, Christopher also begins a revitalization plan for healing the Middle East, which was decimated in a recent plague of mass psychosis that affected every man, woman, and child in the region, which now sits bereft of humanity. The first priority in fixing this region is to rebuild the city of Babylon in Iraq. This site is chosen as a symbol of defiance toward Yahweh, since that was where humankind was first attacked by Yahweh when he afflicted them with tongues when they were erecting the Tower of Babel. He also indicated that he planned to move the United Nations main headquarters there, relocating from the Secretariat Building in New York City.

Throughout the world, people start experiencing brief moments of supernatural power. These powers include the ability to control others' behavior, telepathy, precognition, rapid healing of fatal injuries, and very detailed memories of past lives. Most people's experiences are very brief, mostly linked to a single incident, however these episodes happen all over the world and begin to happen more frequently. Christopher attributes this phenomenon to the fact that people are inching ever closer to that evolutionary step which will bring humanity into its New Age. Christopher then reveals that he will help accelerate this process, by instituting a Eucharist. This Communion remains a closely guarded secret, only to be revealed when the time is right. The communion is said to give people immortality along with great power.

Decker meets with Christopher to discuss this communion, and points out that giving immortality and power to the Christian Fundamentalists, KDP and the other Jews set against Christopher will be counter-productive. He suggests that the best way to keep Christopher's enemies away from the communion is use their own prophecies against them. If a mark is required to receive communion, as well as a pledge by individuals to aid Christopher and all of humankind by working toward the New Age, then Christians, Jews and the KDP will avoid taking the mark, and lack the powers, and immortality to continue their subversive behavior against Humankind. Christopher decides to show Decker the Communion. As they walk, Christopher reminds Decker that Christopher's foster father, Harry Goodman, had developed so-called C-Cells after the discovery of Jesus's blood on the Shroud of Turin. He also reminds Decker of Robert Milner's advanced age, yet remarkable health, due to a blood transfusion with Christopher years before. Decker correctly concludes that the Communion must consist of the distribution of Christopher's blood among the population. Christopher confirms this, and indicates that for the last two years, scientists and technicians have been frantically cloning Christopher's blood, and putting it in medicinal capsules. They enter a huge warehouse that was stocked floor to ceiling, wall-to-wall with Christopher's blood.

The mark of communion was a depiction of the numerals 666, since Christopher's name added up to that value in the Hebrew alphabet, and the intent was to keep Christians and other religious fundamentalists away. As the day drew closer to opening up the clinics to the public, these clinics became the targets for Christian protesters. These protests grew more violent and when the doors were finally opened, the clinics became the targets of terrorist attacks, apparently by Fundamentalists trying to prevent people from taking the communion. Public clamor for the capture and punishment of these terrorists grew until Christopher was forced to take stronger actions. Capital punishment was extended to Christian terrorists, and their fundamentalist leaders. Other than zealots and terrorists, Christians mostly avoided the clinics.

Decker also avoided taking the mark. When confronted by Christopher, in his office in Babylon, Decker, now 72 years old, indicated that he didn't want to live forever. He still missed his family who died in The Disaster years before, and although he was in no hurry to die, he would welcome the rest when it came. Christopher pointed out that Decker, who had been writing speeches for Christopher, and had been promoting New Age principles and philosophies, must have forgotten that all that applied to him as well! His wife and daughters had reincarnated immediately after their deaths, and Decker would not be old and tired after the Communion, and he could go to them and reunite his family. Decker, very excited by this prospect, immediately headed out, and was on his way to the nearest clinic when he was abducted by the KDP.

The KDP took Decker to Petra, Jordan where he stayed in a one-room building. He was confronted by Scott Rosen, the son of Decker's late close friends Joshua and Ilana Rosen. Scott was revealed to be a member of the KDP and was instructed by God to attempt to convert him. After a violent outburst by Decker, which resulted in a shining black eye for Scott, Decker grew calm and attempted to not listen to Scott. Scott presented very convincing arguments about the existence of God, the accuracy of the Bible, and the messages it contained, and how Christopher was a huge liar and the personification of evil. Decker, unimpressed, said nothing and refused to react to anything Rosen said. Rosen presented Decker with a Bible which belonged to Decker's late wife, Elizabeth, complete with her handwriting and notes. After another session with Rosen, Decker continuing to refuse to give Rosen the satisfaction of knowing that some of what he said got through, Rosen released Decker from captivity, promising him a ride to Israel after their observance of Shabbat.

That evening, walking around Petra, Decker met Rhoda Donafin, the widow of Decker's closest friend Tom Donafin, as well as his sons, Tom, Jr., and Decker Donafin (this was the first Decker knew that Tom named one of his children after him, and it affected him greatly). Decker met several people around Petra, and realized that none of the people he met were anything like the overzealous, wild-eyed fundamentalists that he saw on TV, or read about in the papers. These people were caring, friendly and scared. When Rhoda indicated to Decker that they were to be attacked by Christopher and the armies of the world, even offering Decker a timeframe for when this was to occur. Decker promised that was not the case, and if it were, he would talk sense to Christopher, and maybe they could all become friends - or at the least allies - in the evolution of Humankind. Rhoda reacted with an amused dismissal of Decker's promise, however the two remained friendly even if they disagreed on this. Decker ate with the Donafins, and treated them to stories of their father when he and Decker used to share adventures and misadventures when they were younger.

After Shabbat, Decker was provided a ride, as promised, to Israel, where he caught a plane back to his home in Maryland where he planned to rest for a few days. On his way home, he noticed that everyone bearing Christopher's mark was also bearing bandages that covered up painful sores and blisters. Decker decided to hold off on the Communion for a bit.

This first plague of sores caused outrage among Humankind who demanded that Christopher retaliate against Yahweh. The United Nations instituted penalties for sedition and collusion with Yahweh. Leaders of Fundamentalists groups were subject to capital punishment. The rationale was that although capital punishment was distasteful for many, removal of the opposing force was necessary to Humankind's evolutionary journey, and furthermore, individuals would be reincarnated free of their past prejudices and philosophies, and will join everyone else in the procession into the New Age.

During Decker's vacation, the next plague began with the transformation of all the oceans of the earth to blood. The world watched horrified as all aquatic life, and anyone in boats during the transition from water to blood were killed. After a couple of days people in coastal areas grew sick from the decay and stench of the rotting blood, and the surface of the oceans were scabbing over. People were outraged and grew extremely angry toward Yahweh whom Christopher pointed out was responsible for this plague. A week after the plague began, Robert Milner walked out to a bloody coastline and threw a charged quartz crystal that landed on the scab, liquefying it, and turning the liquid back into water. The water began to replace blood in a spreading radius, and after a day, all the oceans were once again water, although, they remained void of life.

The United Nations increased the penalties for sedition and collusion with Yahweh again, this time banning followers of Yahweh from engaging in commerce or owning property. It was made illegal to buy anything from or sell anything to anyone not bearing the mark of Communion. Properties owned by those not bearing the mark were confiscated by the government, and residents not bearing the mark, evicted. Capital punishment was extended toward anyone showing an active role in the subversive behavior against Humankind and the New Age. Decker, by virtue of his position within the United Nations, and by virtue of very few people knowing where he was, remained undisturbed in his home in Maryland. Policemen issuing eviction notices bypassed Decker's home believing that there's no way that Decker Hawthorne - THE Decker Hawthorne - would not have received the Communion, especially when record-keeping errors were not uncommon.

The week following Milner's cleansing of the oceans, all the bodies of fresh water turned to blood. Decker took stock of all the drinkable liquid in his house, and hoarded as much as possible. Decker watched on TV the various horrors that came from this plague. People dying of dehydration, people killing each other for groceries that had liquid (even cans of corn and peas were precious for the water inside), riots and looting. A week after the plague started, Robert Milner walked into a bloody river, and cut his own arm, mingling his own running blood with the blood of the water. The water turned clear and pure. Nearby observers made their exhausted way to the water to quench their thirst. Within a day all the fresh water of the world was cleansed.

In reaction to the anger to this plague, the United Nations again increased the penalties for sedition and collusion with Yahweh, this time extending capital punishment toward anyone refusing to take the mark. Rewards were offered for turning in those not bearing the mark.

Decker, who knew what was going on, read his wife's Bible to determine what would happen next. Decker called his property manager, Bert Tollinson, and had him reinforce a room in his house with insulation and air-conditioning units, and got lots of ice. He warned Bert that extreme heat was coming, and he should do the same for his home so his family wouldn't suffer. Bert took Decker's advice. By midweek the extreme heat was taking its toll. People died in the heat. In Antarctica settlements fell under the ice, and avalanches were common in mountainous regions. The power stations around Decker's home failed, and Decker eventually collapsed and was unable to move. Fortunately Decker's home had been so cold before and well insulated he managed to survive. After a week of the heatwave, Milner arrived in Machu Picchu and made a plea to the sun-god to relent. From where Milner stood, a cool breeze issued forth, and within a day, the heat was back to normal. With normal temperatures restored, Decker soon recovered.

The frequency of executions accelerated in retaliation to this latest plague. So-called "Execution Centers" were established to systematically murder those without a mark. As many as 20,000 people a day were killed in a single Execution Center. At first, only religious leaders and celebrities were televised during their executions. As the anger among humanity grew, so did their demand for televised executions, until some stations began to show executions 24 hours a day.

A week after the heat subsided, a dark murky substance engulfed the entire planet, with the exception of Petra and Christopher's office in Babylon. Everywhere else was consumed by the darkness. Anyone in contact with the darkness (which was almost everyone on the planet) experienced terrifying hallucinations and horrifying visions. Sufferers were incapacitated with fear. This plague only lasted 3 days. After this plague Decker discovered that Christopher's approval rating had dropped from 95% to 11% as a result of the plagues. Decker felt guilty because it was his job to deal with the media and he had been home the whole time rather than doing his job.

In a televised address later that week, Decker watched as Christopher promised that there would be no more plagues and that humankind would receive three signs that their step toward the New Age was nearly complete. Sores would disappear, and telepathic and telekinetic powers would be acquired by everyone who wore the mark, permanently. Finally, Christopher promised that the last remaining vestige of Yahweh's followers were trapped in Petra, and they would all be destroyed.

Decker, horrified, decided to return to Babylon and talk Christopher out of destroying Petra. Since Decker did not bear the mark, he had to get Bert Tollinson to arrange his passage to the United Nations building in Babylon. Decker arrived at Christopher's office and immediately began arguing for sparing the people of Petra. When Christopher refused to talk about the issue, Decker decided that everything that the Jews, Fundamentalists and the KDP had been saying about Christopher was true. Christopher finally showed his true self to Decker, admitting that he was the Antichrist and his only desire was to acquire as many believers that he could, and kill anyone who opposed him. Christopher elaborated that he took pleasure in "mak[ing] the Creator of the Universe weep".

Decker, defeated, realized he, too, was responsible for all Christopher's campaign of death and mayhem. He told Christopher that when he and Decker were both in hell, Decker would be the one on his knees thanking God for giving him what he deserved. At that point Christopher went into an insane fury and murdered Decker - but not before Decker apologized to Jesus for what he had done, and was forgiven, denying Christopher Decker's soul.

Shortly after, the plague of sores that afflicted anyone bearing Christopher's mark vanished. Followers also gained the strength, health and vitality of youth as well as the fantastic powers of telepathy and telekinesis that Christopher had promised them. All of Christopher's promises came true, and his popularity again surged. He planned for a march on Petra and invited every human on Earth to join him. They would use their new powers to tear down the city walls; killing the last non-believers and completing their transcendence.

The Jews within Petra finally joined with the Christians in Petra as one people, when they had been reluctant allies previously. Several rescue missions were sent into Babylon and Jerusalem to find any remaining Christians and transport them to Petra. Some of those bearing Christopher's Mark tried to gain forgiveness from God by amputating their hand, the only way to remove the mark completely. For those desperate enough to do so, the self-mutilation was justified by scripture: citing , "If thy right hand offend thee, cut it off".

As the people of the world gathered in Tel Megiddo in the northern Jezreel Valley, Babylon was destroyed by an immense earthquake and vehicle-sized hail stones. Christopher placated those effected by promising to resurrect Babylon - along with everyone and everything that had been destroyed in it - once Petra had been razed. As Christopher issued the call to begin the invasion of Petra, Jesus Christ appeared on the top of a nearby mountain. Christopher met him there, and offered to allow Jesus to join mankind against the forces of Yahweh. For a moment all of Christopher's followers thought they may be watching an historic alliance being formed. Christopher's offer was met with silence. After this rejection Christopher began to brag to Jesus about how all these hundreds of millions of people rejected Jesus in favor of Christopher, boasting that "those you wanted as your bride have become my whores and sluts". The sudden realization of Christopher's cynicism lead to panic. Jesus forced Christopher and Robert Milner into a fiery chasm. Christopher's army collapsed upon itself and quickly decomposed as individuals vainly struggled to escape.

The epilogue features Decker's reunion with his wife and children, his brother Nate, and the Donafins, including Tom, as well as many friends and acquaintances from throughout his life. Decker also met Jesus Christ who told Decker that all was forgiven, and he was glad Decker had finally accepted Him, even if it was during Decker's final moments of life. Tom and Elizabeth explained to Decker what happened between his death and his resurrection. While Decker mourned those who had not been able to join them in this Kingdom, but mostly rejoiced that he had his wife and daughter's back.

Reception
Don D'Ammassa had a mixed comment in his review for Chronicle saying "not to everyone's taste, including mine, but well enough written."

Notes

References

2003 science fiction novels
American Christian novels
Novelistic portrayals of Jesus
Novels about cloning